The Bristol and Suburban Association Football League is a football competition in England. The league has 6 divisions, the highest of which sits at level 12 of the English football league system. The league is affiliated to the Gloucestershire County FA. It is one of three feeders to the Gloucestershire County League.

History 

The Bristol and Suburban Association Football League was formed in 1894 under the name North Bristol and District Association Football League. The inaugural meeting of the League was held on September 14, 1894 at the Phoenix Coffee Palace, which was situated in Ashley Road, Montpelier, Bristol. This meeting was attended by representatives of the following clubs who were responsible for setting up the working arrangements and funding of the new League.
 Beaufort Albion
 Bethesda
 Croft End
 Phoenix Rangers
 Rose Green
 Wanderers
 Westbourne

These seven clubs can be considered the founder members of the League and games commenced at the outset of the 1894–95 season.  It was not until 1906 that the League's current name first appeared.

The following trophies are presented by the League

 Alfred Bosley Memorial Cup – first competed for in 1952–53 by clubs from selected Divisions but currently restricted to Clubs playing in the top three Divisions of the League.
 Norman Goulding Memorial Cup – competed for each season since 1984–85 by senior teams of the Clubs playing in Division two and below.
 Tom Pitts Memorial Cup –  presented annually since 1984 to the Club Secretary who has administered the affairs of his/her club with outstanding efficiency.

Among the clubs that have left the Bristol and Suburban Association Football League and now compete at a higher level are:
Almondsbury  (now known as Almondsbury UWE)
Backwell United (now known as Ashton & Backwell United)
Brislington
Bristol Telephones
Clevedon (now known as Clevedon Town)
Hengrove Athletic
Little Stoke
Manor Farm (now known as Bristol Manor Farm)
Tytherington Rocks
Winterbourne United

Greenway Sports and Almondsbury both played in the Bristol & Suburban League. Greenway Sports won the Bristol Premier Combination on a number of occasions in the early 1970s. The clubs amalgamated as Almondsbury Greenway in 1974 and reached the final of the FA Vase at Wembley Stadium in 1979, where Almondsbury Greenway were beaten by Billericay Town.  The club changed its name to Almondsbury Town and in the 2010/11 season played in Southern Football League Division One South & West where they finished eighth. However, following the loss of their Oaklands Park home venue, the club dropped to the Bristol & Suburban League, and after one season back in the league, folded altogether.

Champions

References

External links
Official website 

 
Football leagues in England
Sports leagues established in 1894
1894 establishments in England
Football in Bristol